The Monrovia doctorfish (Acanthurus monroviae) is present in the tropical eastern Atlantic Ocean from southern Morocco to Angola, including the Canary islands, Cape Verde and Gulf of Guinea. It has been observed, but rarely, in the Mediterranean Sea since 1987. Vagrants have also been reported from the coast of Brazil.

References

External links
 Photos of Acanthurus monroviae in iNaturalist

Acanthurus
Fish of the East Atlantic
Fish of the Mediterranean Sea
Marine fauna of West Africa
Fish described in 1876
Taxa named by Franz Steindachner